The Corps Regimental Sergeant Major (Corps RSM) is the most senior warrant officer of the Royal Marines. Responsible for maintaining standards and discipline within the Royal Marines, they act as a parental figure to their subordinates and also to junior officers, even though the latter technically outrank the RSM.

Post creation
The post was created in 1989. He is addressed as "Mr" by officers and "Sir" by all other ranks. Routinely known as "the Corps RSM"

"It has been decided to appoint a representative Regimental Sergeant Major, who will be responsible for centralised events involving Warrant Officers and Senior Non Commissioned Officers and upon who the Commandant General can call for advice should he so desire. The Warrant officers so appointed will be called the Corps Regimental Sergeant Major (Corps RSM)"

Royal Marine Routine Orders, Monday 20th February 1989. (signed by Maj. Gen. H. Y. La R. Beverley)

List of Royal Marines Corps Regimental Sergeant Majors

See also
Warrant Officer of the Royal Air Force – Royal Air Force equivalent
Warrant Officer of the Naval Service – Royal Navy equivalent
Army Sergeant Major – British Army equivalent

References

Royal Marines
Royal Navy appointments
Warrant officers